Thomas David Boyatt (born March 4, 1933) is a former diplomat and United States Ambassador to Burkina Faso (1978–80) and Colombia (1980–83). He is a member of the American Academy of Diplomacy.  He was held captive for six days in a Palestinian hijacking in the 1960s. He graduated from Wyoming High School in 1951.  He continues to return to his former high school to speak to students during the Wyoming School Foundation Day.

Biography

After Boyatt was born in Ohio and graduated from Wyoming High School in 1951, he graduated from Princeton University with his B.A. in 1955. He later received his M.A. from the Fletcher School of Law and Diplomacy. He served in the U.S. Air Force from 1956 to 1959.

Boyatt joined the U.S. Foreign Service in 1959. He served in various diplomatic posts around the globe, including Vice Consul in Chile from 1960 to 1962, Assistant to the Under Secretary of the Treasury (1962–1964), Economic Officer in Luxembourg (1964–1966), and Political Counselor in Cyprus (1967–1970). He later became Special Assistant to the Assistant Secretary of State for the Near East in Washington D.C..  He was Director of Cyprus Affairs from 1971 to 1974), and was named a member of the Senior Seminar in Foreign Policy the following year.  In 1975 Boyatt became Minister-Counselor at the American Embassy in Chile.  Boyatt was nominated to be the United States Ambassador to Upper Volta in 1978 by President Jimmy Carter, and in 1980 he was again nominated to serve diplomatically as the United States Ambassador to Colombia.  In 1983 Boyatt was promoted to the rank of Career Minister in the Foreign Service.

In 1969, Boyatt was taken hostage on board a TWA plane by Palestinian guerillas during the 1969 TWA Flight 840 hijacking. Boyatt and the other passengers were later released, and Boyatt has received many medals and awards for his bravery and heroism during the hijacking.

Although Boyatt retired from the Foreign service in 1985, he became Vice President of Sears World Trade and President of U.S. Defense Systems (USDS) in 1990.  Boyatt later became a member of the Advisory Boards of the Woodrow Wilson School at Princeton University and trustee from 1984 to 1988. He has also been a member of the Advisory Boards of the Patterson School at the University of Kentucky and is currently a Director of the Institute for the Study of Diplomacy at Georgetown University, where he teaches. He is President of the Foreign Affairs Council, an umbrella group comprising eleven organizations which support the Foreign Service, and Treasurer of AFSA-PAC. He is a member of the American Academy of Diplomacy and several other corporate and non-profit boards. He is married to Maxine Freedom Boyatt and has five children, Christopher Lynn Boyatt being one of his sons.

Awards and honors
Meritorious Honor Award from the U.S. State Department  – 1969
William R. Rivkin Award – 1970
Christian A. Herter Award - 1979
Foreign Service Cup – 1999
Lifetime Achievement Award  from the American Foreign Service Association (AFSA) – 2001
Lifetime Contributions to American Diplomacy Award.  – 2008

Boyatt has also been decorated by several other governments and organizations.

External links
Ambassador Boyatt's lecture on the 100 Years Wars of the 20th Century in Hargreaves Hall on the Cheney Campus of Eastern Washington University .
Ambassador Boyatt's reflection upon his career .
Ambassador Boyatt on Facebook .
Foreign Service Journal article on his Lifetime Contributions to American Diplomacy Award.

References

1933 births
People from Cincinnati
Ambassadors of the United States to Colombia
Ambassadors of the United States to Burkina Faso
Living people
People from Wyoming, Ohio
Princeton University alumni
The Fletcher School at Tufts University alumni
Hijacking survivors
United States Foreign Service personnel